Rachel Tayza (born Htoo Htwe Tayza in 14 September 1996), also known as RACHEL, is a Burmese pop singer and songwriter. She rose to fame with her solo album Kabar. She is the daughter of Burmese business tycoon Tay Za.

Early life
Rachel was born on 14 September 1996 to Tay Za and Thida Zaw, the youngest of three children. Her father Tay Za is a business tycoon, and is chairman of Htoo Group of Companies.

Career
Rachel started learning and playing the guitar at the age of 13. She discovered her real passion and has devoted her life to becoming a musician. She began her music career by making cover songs and posting them on YouTube. As of her notable achievement, she made the background music album for the popular film Nya. Since then, she has become popular, having performed in various major music concerts and even live concerts. 

In 2018, she started endeavoring to be able to produce and distribute her first solo album. She released her debut solo album Kabar on 21 September 2019 which was officially distributed to all parts of Myanmar. The album was a commercial success, reaching the top of the album charts. On 24 August 2019, she performed in the Alive in Yangon's second music concert called The Blue Night, together with Mary and Gabriel Phway. In December 2019, she released a single song and music video with featured artists, X-Boxin, called "Thu," on her Facebook page which earned 1 million views within 24 hours and was the longest leading No 3 song in Myanmar Top Chart on Joox.

On 31 January 2023, on the eve of the 2nd anniversary of the 2021 Myanmar coup d'état, the US government sanctioned Rachel for providing financial support to Myanmar's military regime due to her association with the Htoo Group of Companies. She is a director and shareholder of numerous subsidiaries and associated companies under the Htoo Group of Companies umbrella. She owned Nova Lifestyle Holdings, and its registration is currently suspended.

Discography

Albums

Myit (for Nya film) (2018)
Kabar (2019)

Singles

Ser Myat Nar (2017)
Ani Youn Alwan (2017)
Thu (2019)

References

Living people
1996 births
People from Yangon
Burmese YouTubers
Burmese pop singers
21st-century Burmese women singers
Specially Designated Nationals and Blocked Persons List
Individuals related to Myanmar sanctions